Samavak may refer to:
 Samavak, Hamadan
 Samavak, Markazi